Yarke is a village in the district of Lenine Raion in Crimea.

Geography 
Yarke is located in the south of the district and the Kerch Peninsula, to the west of Uzunlarske Lake and the village of Vulkanivka.

References 

Villages in Crimea